Bolivia participated at the 2018 Summer Youth Olympics in Buenos Aires, Argentina from 6 October to 18 October 2018.

Athletics

Beach volleyball

Bolivia qualified a boys' and girls' team based on their overall ranking from the South American Youth Tour.

 Boys' tournament - 1 team of 2 athletes
 Girls' tournament - 1 team of 2 athletes

Cycling

Bolivia qualified a mixed BMX racing team based on its ranking in the Youth Olympic Games BMX Junior Nation Rankings.

 Mixed BMX racing team - 1 team of 2 athletes

BMX racing

Equestrian

Bolivia qualified a rider based on its ranking in the FEI World Jumping Challenge Rankings.

 Individual Jumping - 1 athlete

Futsal

Summary

Group C

Semi-finals

Finals

Gymnastics

Rhythmic
Bolivia qualified one gymnast based on its performance at the 2018 American Junior Championship.

 Girls' rhythmic individual all-around - 1 quota

References

2018 in Bolivian sport
Nations at the 2018 Summer Youth Olympics
Bolivia at the Youth Olympics